Bolshoy Dor is a rural locality (a village) in Sidorovskoye Rural Settlement, Gryazovetsky District, Vologda Oblast, Russia. The population was 10 as of 2002.

Geography 
Bolshoy Dor is located 51 km southeast of Gryazovets (the district's administrative centre) by road. Bekrenevo is the nearest rural locality.

References 

Rural localities in Gryazovetsky District